Face the Truth is the third solo album from Stephen Malkmus, released on May 23, 2005 in the UK and May 24, 2005 in the US.

Although not formally credited as a Jicks record, much like the earlier self-titled record, each member of the band is featured on at least one track of the album, and "& The Jicks" is written on the back of the sleeve.

Prior to its release, the album title was rumored to be Hamburger Serenade. Malkmus discounted those online rumors and said the album was always leaning toward the title it was given.

This album was chosen as one of Amazon.com's Top 100 Editor's Picks of 2005.

Track listing
"Pencil Rot" – 4:08
"It Kills" – 4:39
"I've Hardly Been" – 2:56
"Freeze the Saints" – 3:54
"Loud Cloud Crowd" – 3:32
"No More Shoes" – 8:00
"Mama" – 3:11
"Kindling for the Master" – 3:20
"Post-Paint Boy" – 4:08
"Baby C'mon" – 2:44
"Malediction" – 2:50
Bonus tracks
"Wow-Ass Jeans" - 3:13

References

Stephen Malkmus albums
2005 albums
Matador Records albums
Domino Recording Company albums